Coleothrix is a genus of snout moths in the subfamily Phycitinae. It was described by Ragonot in 1888.

Taxonomy
Coleothrix has been listed as a synonym of Addyme by Walley in 1970, but considered as a valid name by Roesler & Küppers in 1979.

Species
 Coleothrix crassitibiella Ragonot, 1888
 Coleothrix longicosta Du, Song and Wu, 2007 
 Coleothrix obscuriella (Inoue, 1959) 
 Coleothrix swinhoeella (Ragonot, 1893)

References

Phycitinae
Pyralidae genera